Indriati Gerald Bernardina (born 9 June 1942), also known by her stage name Indriati Iskak and after marriage as Indri Makki, is an Indonesian actress turned psychologist and marketer. She entered the Indonesian film industry and soared to popularity with Usmar Ismail's commercially successful Tiga Dara (1957). She appeared in eight further films and established her own girl group before retiring from cinema in 1963. For twenty-six years she worked with Unilever, and since 1994 she has been a marketing consultant with Makki Makki.

Biography

Indriati Iskak was born on 9 June 1942, at Santa Melania Hospital, in Surabaya, East Java. She is the daughter of Robert Maria "Bob" Iskak (1912–2002), an educator who transitioned to film in 1952, when he became the director of Penjelendup (Smuggler).

Indriati made her feature film debut in Usmar Ismail's Tiga Dara (Three Maidens) in 1957, starring alongside Chitra Dewi and Mieke Wijaya. She portrayed Nenny, the youngest of three sisters raised by their grandmother after their mother's death. The film was a massive popular success, and Indriati, who was praised for having a more naturalistic acting style than her stage-trained fellow actors, achieved the greatest popularity among her co-stars.

The following year Indriati appeared in another of Ismail's films, Sengketa (Conflict, 1957). She again played the daughter in a family fraught with difficulties. After this film, Indriati completed two productions with Djuprihadi's Stupa Film, both under the direction of Wim Umboh: Djuara Sepatu Roda (Roller Skating Champion, 1958) and Tiga Mawar (Three Roses, 1959). With Rima Melati, and Baby Huwae, she formed a girl group named the Baby Dolls in 1959.

Indriati continued acting through 1963, when she made her last film, Daun Emas (Golden Leaves). It was directed by her father and co-starred her brother Boy. Indriati's popularity during the 1950s and 1960s has been credited with leading Indonesian film directors to seek out Indo-looking actresses for their films, and thus precipitating the careers of film stars such as Lydia Kandou, Meriam Bellina, and Tamara Bleszynski. Advertising for Perfini's Asrama Dara (Dormitory for Girls; 1958) touted its young star Suzzanna, an Indo girl from Bogor, as the next Indriati Iskak.

After Daun Emas, Indriati retired from acting and went to university, completing a degree in psychology at the University of Indonesia in 1968. After some time working at the Indonesian Air Force's psychological counselling bureau, in the 1970s she began working at Unilever. She stayed with the company for twenty-six years, at first handling market research before moving on to marketing management and advertising. Towards the end of her time with Unilever, she oversaw the computerisation of the company's Indonesia branch.

Indriati married an Indonesian Air Force officer, Makki Perdanakusuma (the younger brother of Halim Perdanakusuma), in May 15, 1962. The couple had three children and four grandchildren. They remained married until Makki Perdanakusuma's death on 27 July 2014. , Indriati is a branding consultant with Makki Makki, having worked there since 1994. Her daughter Sania and son Sakti also work for the company.

Filmography
During her six-year film career, Indriati appeared in nine films.

Tiga Dara (1956)
Sengketa (1957)
Djuara Sepatu Roda (1958)
Tiga Mawar (1959)
Desa yang Dilupakan (1960)
Gadis Diseberang Djalan (1960)
Djantung Hati (1961)
Masih Ada Hari Esok (1961)
Daun Emas (1963)

References

Works cited

 
 

1942 births
Living people
People from Surabaya
Indonesian Christians
Indonesian film actresses
Indonesian Roman Catholics
Javanese people
Indonesian businesspeople
University of Indonesia alumni
Indo people